The Iraqi records in swimming are the fastest ever performances of swimmers from Iraq, which are recognised and ratified by the Iraqi Swimming Federation.

All records were set in finals unless noted otherwise.

Long Course (50 m)

Men

Women

Short Course (25 m)

Men

Women

References

Iraq
Records
Swimming
Swimming